Okhotsky District is an administrative and municipal district (raion), one of the seventeen in Khabarovsk Krai, Russia. It is located in the north of the krai. Its administrative center is the urban locality (a work settlement) of Okhotsk. Population:  The population of Okhotsk accounts for 51.4% of the district's total population.

Demographics
Ethnic composition (2010):
 Russians – 78.9%
 Evens – 11.7%
 Ukrainians – 2.4%
 Evenks – 1.5%
 Koreans – 1.5%
 Yakuts – 1.1%
 Others – 2.9%

References

Notes

Sources

Districts of Khabarovsk Krai